The James Beard Public Market is a proposed public market in Portland, Oregon. It is named after James Beard, a Portland-born chef and cookbook writer. The market was planned to be located at the west end of the Morrison Bridge in downtown Portland, in what are currently parking lots, but this site was dropped in November 2016 after concerns over pedestrian accessibility due to the bridgehead ramps. The developer, Melvin Mark Development, still plans to build a 17-story building at the same site. Original designs for the market called for it to have two halls, totaling , along with 60 permanent and 30 to 40 temporary stalls for food vendors. Design for the market is being led by the Norwegian architectural firm Snøhetta.

History 

Part of the originally proposed site of the market abuts The Oregonian Printing Press Park, where the first copy of The Oregonian was printed in December 1850.

The original site for the James Beard Public Market is located near the former site of the Portland Public Market, which was the largest public market in the United States when it was built in December 1933 for $1 million. It was located on what is now Tom McCall Waterfront Park in between the Hawthorne Bridge and Morrison Bridge. Its construction enabled removal of the on-street Carroll Public Market. After closing in 1942 due to lack of demand, it was later used as the headquarters of The Oregon Journal from 1948 to 1961. Demolition occurred in 1969.

Multnomah County sold  of property to Melvin Mark Companies and the James Beard Public Market Foundation in June 2012 for $10.43 million.

Design 
The market is expected to cost $30 million to construct, with the funds coming from public donations and Multnomah County. According to the market's director, it will include solar panels and green roofing, be divided into  stalls, and have a mezzanine level for education and cooking classes.

Portland city officials considered removing or modifying the cloverleaf ramps that run from the Morrison Bridge to Naito Parkway, while the market proposed moving the ramps to Morrison and Stark streets, allowing easier pedestrian access from the waterfront. However, the market and the city failed to reach a decision on the ramps, leading the market to abandon the waterfront site in November 2016. Other sites near the Oregon Museum of Science and Industry and in the South Waterfront are under consideration as alternatives.

The initial design for the market was unveiled on June 25, 2015 at the Oregon Museum of Science and Industry. Facing Naito Parkway and the Willamette River, there would have been  of storefronts, with a facade of glass doors to allow outdoor seating during good weather. A terraced rooftop garden with views of Mount Hood was also planned.

See also
 Pine Street Market, a nearby food hall

References 

Buildings and structures in Portland, Oregon
Economy of Portland, Oregon
Food markets in the United States
Food retailers
Market halls
Proposed buildings and structures in Oregon